Football Club Edineț is a Moldovan football club based in Edineț, Moldova. They play in the Divizia B, the third tier of Moldovan football.

External links
Official website
FC Edineț on Soccerway.com

Football clubs in Moldova
Association football clubs established in 2011
FC Edinet